Raju Sethi (born 22 June 1962) is an Indian former cricketer. He played thirteen first-class matches for Delhi between 1978 and 1984.

See also
 List of Delhi cricketers

References

External links
 

1962 births
Living people
Indian cricketers
Delhi cricketers
Cricketers from Amritsar